Wireless Latin Entertainment (WILAEN) is a United States producer and distributor of Latin digital entertainment content formed in 2001. The WILAEN distribution network has a presence in eight countries:  Argentina, Brazil, Colombia, Dominican Republic, Guatemala, Mexico, Peru, and the U.S.

Through its  brand, Latin Garage, WILAEN produces and distributes digital services and content, such as mastertones, ringbacks, polyphonic ringtones, video ringers, images and wallpapers, and full-track downloads.

References

External Links:
AT&T Wireless Offers Latin Mobile Content

Music companies of the United States
Mobile content